OTC Markets Group (previously known as Pink Sheets) is an American  financial market providing price and liquidity information for almost 10,000 over-the-counter (OTC) securities. The group has its headquarters in New York City.  OTC-traded securities are organized into three markets to inform investors of opportunities and risks: OTCQX, OTCQB and Pink.

History 
The company was first established in 1913 as the National Quotation Bureau (NQB).  For decades, the NQB reported quotations for both stocks and bonds, publishing the quotations in the paper-based Pink Sheets and Yellow Sheets respectively. The publications were named for the color of paper on which they were printed. NQB was owned by CCH from 1963 to 1993. In September 1999, the NQB introduced the real-time Electronic Quotation Service. The National Quotation Bureau changed its name to Pink Sheets LLC in 2000 and subsequently to Pink OTC Markets in 2008. The company eventually changed to its current name, OTC Markets Group, in 2010. Today, a network of 89 broker-dealers price and trade a wide spectrum of securities on the OTC Markets platform.

To be quoted on the platform, companies are not required to file with the SEC, although many choose to do so. A wide range of companies are quoted on OTC Markets, including firmly established foreign firms, mostly through American depositary receipts (ADRs). In addition, many closely held, extremely small and thinly traded U.S. companies have their primary trading on the OTC Markets platform.

Many foreign issuers adhere to the listing requirements of qualified foreign stock exchanges and make their home country disclosure available in English. There are also a significant number of U.S.-based issuers who are current in their reporting to regulators  such as the U.S. Securities and Exchange Commission (SEC) or make available ongoing quarterly and audited annual financial reports through OTC Markets Group. Many companies in the Pink market tier of the OTC categorization system do not meet the United States' listing requirements for trading on a stock exchange such as the New York Stock Exchange or NASDAQ. Many of these issuers do not file periodic reports or make available audited financial statements, making it very difficult for investors to find reliable, unbiased information about those companies. For these reasons the SEC views many of the lower-tier companies traded on OTC Markets as "among the most risky investments" and advises potential investors to heavily research the companies in which they plan to invest.

Securities trading on the OTCQB and higher-tiered OTCQX trading marketplaces have status of Blue Sky secondary trading exemptions in 33 states and brokers may recommend such securities to their clients like securities listed on national stock exchanges.

Markets
OTC Markets Group designates securities in one of three markets to indicate the level of financial and corporate disclosure provided by the companies using its quotation system.  Apart from the OTCQX market, which has rules that include financial requirements, the designations do not signify issuer quality or merit of any security. Designation is based on the level and timeliness of a company's disclosure and OTCQB and any of the Pink categories can include both high quality as well as speculative, distressed, or questionable companies. Strict promotion policies have been enacted to flag these companies and deny their application for trading if they engage actively in campaigns marked by misleading information or manipulative promotions.

The OTCQX and OTCQB markets are considered 'Established Public Markets' by the SEC for the purpose of determining the public market price when registering securities for resale with the SEC in equity line financings. OTC Markets Group can facilitate electronic trading with its SEC-registered Alternative Trading System known as OTC Link® ATS.

OTCQX
The OTCQX market includes both multinational companies seeking access to U.S. investors and domestic growth companies.  To be traded on this tier, companies must undergo a qualitative review by OTC Markets Group. Companies are not required to be registered with or reporting to the SEC, but they must post financial information with OTC Markets Group. In addition, U.S. companies must be ongoing operations (i.e., no shells) and may not be in bankruptcy, while foreign issuers must meet the requirements of qualified foreign exchanges. Additional oversight of OTCQX securities is provided by requiring every issuer to be sponsored by approved third-party investment banks or law firms, called OTCQX Sponsors.

Pink
Pink is an open market that has no financial standards or reporting requirements. The stock of companies in the Pink tier are not required to be registered with the SEC. Companies in this category are further categorized by the level and timeliness of information they provide to investors and may have current, limited, or no public disclosure.

Current Information
Companies submitting regular Quarterly and Annual Reports go into the Current category. This category can still include shell companies or development stage companies with little or no operations as well as companies without audited financial statements. Companies in this category must not only have Quarterly reports duly posted every three months, but most have Annual reports for at least the preceding two years on file.

Limited Information
Companies that have submitted information no older than six months to the OTC Markets data and news service or have made a filing on the SEC's EDGAR system in the previous six months are rated as having limited information. Companies that are unwilling or unable to meet OTC Markets' Guidelines for Providing Adequate Current Information with Quarterly and Annual Reports every three months, but which still submit information at least every six months, are in this category. These are often companies with financial reporting problems, economic distress, or in bankruptcy.

No Information
This tier indicates companies that are unwilling or unable to provide disclosure to the public markets. Companies in this category do not make current information available via OTC Markets disclosure and news service, or if they do, the available information is older than six months. This category includes defunct companies that have ceased operations as well as "dark" companies with questionable management and market disclosure practices. Securities of publicly traded companies that are not willing to provide information to investors are considered highly risky.

Caveat Emptor
There is a public interest concern associated with the company designated as "Caveat Emptor" (Latin for "buyer beware".) This may include a spam campaign, stock promotion or known investigation of fraudulent activity committed by the company or through inside information. During a spam campaign, any stock that is not in the Current Information category will also have its quotes blocked on otcmarkets.com.

Quotation eligibility 
The SEC requires broker-dealers to comply with Exchange Act Rule 15c2-11 before displaying quotes on OTC securities, and requires submission of Form 211 to the FINRA OTC Compliance Unit. In 2019, amendments were proposed to 15c2-11, which had not been significantly amended since 1991. 

FINRA Rule 6500 contains rules on quoting OTC securities on the OTCBB, but the OTCBB has diminished in importance and by 2016 less than 2% of OTC trades occurred on the OTCBB, as opposed to OTC Markets. In 2014, FINRA proposed to remove Rule 6500 and eliminate the OTCBB, but withdrew the rule and in 2016 proposed to update the OTCBB to provide a backup system in case quotation is disrupted or nonexistent.

Other FINRA rules such as Rule 6432 and Rule 5250 relate to the SEC Rule 15c2-11; for example, Rule 5250 prohibits market makers from receiving compensation from issuers.

Risks and regulation 
Many of the stocks traded OTC are microcap stocks, also known as penny stocks, which are known for fraudulent microcap stock fraud and penny stock scams.

After the passage of Sarbanes-Oxley Act in 2002, some companies delisted and became OTC to save costs and avoid certain regulations, although OTC companies have faced pressure to improve disclosure.

Other OTC markets

OTCBB 
The OTC Bulletin Board (OTCBB) is only a listing of securities that are also traded "over the counter" similar to the OTC Markets. The OTCBB has diminished in importance, with very little activity, but has been retained as possible last resort system in case of disruption. OTCBB companies are required to file timely reports to a U.S. regulatory agency. Almost all OTCBB companies are now quoted via OTC Markets' OTC Link ATS because its fully electronic trading platform better meets the needs of automated broker-dealers.

Grey Market 
Securities that are not listed on any stock exchange nor formally quoted on OTC Markets or OTCBB are considered to be in the Grey Market.  Unsolicited transactions are processed independently and not centrally listed or quoted.  Trades are reported to a self-regulatory organization (SRO), which then passes the data on to market data companies. The Grey Market is also called OTOTC or Other OTC.

Compliance Data Products

Compliance Analytics

The Compliance Analytics Product creates a security specific risk score for all OTCQX, OTCQB, Pink and Grey securities. Risk is assessed over 19 parameters including caveat emptor, shell status, penny stock status, price/volume changes and stock promotion data. Recently, the product integrated "Hot Sector" information about cannabis, cryptocurrency and blockchain.

Promotion Data

The Promotion Data Product provides market professionals and investors with active and historical promotion data for OTCQX, OTCQB, Pink and Grey securities.

Index products
The company calculates and licenses indices of securities that trade on one of the top two market tiers, including the OTCM QX ADR 30 Index of OTCQX-traded American depository receipts

References

External links 

 
 SEC information about OTC Markets
 SEC Listing and Delisting Requirements

 
Electronic trading platforms
Financial services companies of the United States
1913 establishments in New York (state)
 
American companies established in 1913
Financial services companies established in 1913